Socialist Movement of Catalonia (in Catalan: Moviment Socialista de Catalunya, MSC) was a political party in Catalonia, Spain. The MSC was founded in exile the 14 of January 1945 by ex-members of the POUM, PSUC and Republican Left of Catalonia. Due to the Francoist State the party acted underground in Catalonia.

History
In 1968, after the May 1968 movement the party split in two factions, one led Josep Pallach i Carolà, with a social democratic ideology; and another, led by Joan Reventós with a marxist ideology. The party fully split in 1974, when the social-democrats created the Socialist Party of Catalonia–Regrouping and the marxists the Socialist Convergence of Catalonia.

See also
Socialists' Party of Catalonia
Socialist Party of Catalonia–Regrouping
Socialist Convergence of Catalonia
List of political parties in Catalonia

References

 Glòria Rubiol (1995). Josep Pallach i el reagrupament. L'Abadia de Montserrat. .

Political parties in Catalonia
Anti-Francoism
Socialist parties in Catalonia